The First Synod of Tyre or the Council of Tyre (335 AD) was a gathering of bishops called together by Emperor Constantine I for the primary purpose of evaluating charges brought against Athanasius, the Patriarch of Alexandria.

Background
Athanasius was involved in the early Christian christological and trinitarian debates, and supported the position of the Council of Nicaea in opposition to that of Arius and his followers.

In 328, Athanasius was elected as bishop or patriarch of Alexandria. Alexandria happened to be the city in which Arius was a priest. The situation was further complicated, as Athanasius had not yet reached the age of 30 - the minimum age for bishops in the church.

After Athanasius succeeded to the see of Alexandria, the Arians had accused Athanasius of, among other things: immoral conduct, illegally taxing the Egyptian people, supporting rebels to the Imperial throne, and even murdering a bishop and keeping his severed hand for use in magical rites. More to the  point, Constantine was persuaded to ask Athanasius to re-admit Arius to the church—which he would not do. In 334 Athanasius was summoned before a synod in Caesarea, which he did not attend.

The Synod
The emperor Constantine had ordered a Synod of bishops to be present at the consecration of the church which he had erected at Jerusalem (the precursor to the Holy Sepulchre).  He directed that, as a secondary matter, they should on their way first assemble at Tyre, to examine charges that had been brought against Athanasius.  The Emperor also sent a letter to Athanasius, making clear that if he did not attend voluntarily, he would be brought to the Synod forcibly.

Eusebius of Nicomedia played a major role in the council and, according to Epiphanius of Salamis, presided over the assembly. About 310 members attended. Athanasius appeared this time with 48 Egyptian bishops. The Synod condemned Athanasius, so he went to Constantinople and confronted the Emperor personally.

Aftermath
At a hearing in the presence of the Emperor, Athanasius was cleared of all charges except one: threatening to cut off the grain supply to Constantinople from Egypt. This one charge was enough for the Emperor to exile Athanasius to Trier, then part of the Gallic prefecture of Rome (in present-day Germany).  

Athanasius did not return from exile until the death of Constantine in 337.

The Arianism of the Synod of Tyre was ultimately overturned by the Council of Constantinople.

See also
 4th century in Lebanon

References
Socrates Scholasticus & Sozomen, Historia Ecclesiastica, Book II: from the Council of Nicea to Constantine's death
Westminster Dictionary of Church History, ed. Jerald C. Brauer (Philadelphia: Westminster Press, 1971)

335
330s in the Roman Empire
Christianity in Anglo-Saxon England
4th-century church councils
Tyre, Lebanon